Puto is a song by the Mexican band Molotov from their album ¿Dónde Jugarán las Niñas?. The word puto literally translates as "asshole", which is often used as a derogatory term for gay males in Mexican Spanish, equal to the American slang faggot. The term, as many other homophobic slurs in Mexican Spanish is also used to describe men that behave in an unmanly manner, for example, cowards. Although the song itself allegedly follows the latter connotation in which the group is mocking those who do not stand up for themselves, the lyrics do not only include "puto," but also "marica," and "joto," other homophobic slurs.

The band faced criticism when the song was interpreted as a slur against homosexuals. As a result, the group's first tour in Germany was met with crowds of angry gay and lesbian protesters.

In defense of the band and their use of the word "puto," producer Gustavo Santaolalla told an interviewer from the Spanish language rock and roll magazine Retila:

A remix version of the song exists on their second album Molomix.

1997 songs
Molotov (band) songs
LGBT-related songs
Universal Music Latino singles